Miguel Ngwa (born 4 June 2004) is an English professional footballer who plays as a midfielder for  club AFC Rushden & Diamonds, on loan from  club Northampton Town.

Career
Ngwa made his first-team debut for Northampton Town on 2 November 2021, in a 2–1 defeat to Brighton & Hove Albion U21 in an EFL Trophy match at Sixfields Stadium. He signed his first professional contract in June 2022. He joined Southern League Premier Division Central side AFC Rushden & Diamonds on loan during the 2022–23 season and scored his first senior goal for the club in a 2–1 defeat at Royston Town.

Career statistics

References

2004 births
Living people
English footballers
Association football midfielders
Northampton Town F.C. players
AFC Rushden & Diamonds players
English Football League players
Southern Football League players
Black British sportspeople